John Finnegan (born 3 July 1943) is a Scottish former footballer, who played left back in the Football League for Millwall.

External links

1943 births
Living people
Scottish footballers
Footballers from Glasgow
Association football fullbacks
Clyde F.C. players
Clydebank Juniors F.C. players
Ebbsfleet United F.C. players
Millwall F.C. players
English Football League players
Scottish Football League players